Julius L. London (November 7, 1882 – May 25, 1949) was an American Negro league pitcher in the 1900s.

A native of Moscow, Tennessee, London pitched for the St. Paul Colored Gophers in 1909. In his two recorded starts, he posted a 1–0 record, allowing five earned runs in  innings pitched. London died in Philadelphia, Pennsylvania in 1949 at age 66.

References

External links
 and Seamheads

1882 births
1949 deaths
St. Paul Colored Gophers players
20th-century African-American people